SM Nuruzzaman is a politician of Naogaon District of Bangladesh and former member of Parliament for Naogaon-2 constituency in 1988.

Career 
Nuruzzaman was elected to parliament from Naogaon-2 as an independent candidate in 1988.

References 

Living people
Year of birth missing (living people)
People from Naogaon District
Bangladeshi politicians